Banner is a village in Fulton County, Illinois, United States. The population was 189 at the 2010 census, up from 149 at the 2000 census.

The current mayor of Banner is Kenneth Fuller. The current two year trustee is David Zimmerman.

Geography
Banner is located in eastern Fulton County at  (40.514730, -89.910537). It is on the southwest side of Copperas Creek north of the creek's mouth at the Illinois River.

U.S. Route 24 passes through Banner, leading northeast  to Peoria and southwest  to Lewistown, the Fulton County seat. Illinois Route 9 leads northwest from Banner  to Canton, the largest city in Fulton County.

Demographics

As of the census of 2000, there were 149 people, 54 households, and 44 families residing in the village. The racial makeup of the village was 95.97% White, 2.01% Native American, 2.01% from other races. Hispanic or Latino of any race were 4.03% of the population.

There were 54 households, out of which 37.0% had children under the age of 18 living with them, 66.7% were married couples living together, 13.0% had a female householder with no husband present, and 16.7% were non-families. 11.1% of all households were made up of individuals, and 5.6% had someone living alone who was 65 years of age or older. The average household size was 2.76 and the average family size was 2.87.

In the village, the population was spread out, with 28.2% under the age of 18, 6.0% from 18 to 24, 34.9% from 25 to 44, 18.1% from 45 to 64, and 12.8% who were 65 years of age or older. The median age was 34 years. For every 100 females, there were 98.7 males. For every 100 females age 18 and over, there were 98.1 males.

The median income for a household in the village was $31,250, and the median income for a family was $28,125. Males had a median income of $26,528 versus $17,000 for females. The per capita income for the village was $13,101. There were 11.6% of families and 19.1% of the population living below the poverty line, including 23.7% of under eighteens and 20.0% of those over 64.

References

Villages in Fulton County, Illinois
Villages in Illinois